Hometown, My Town is an album by American singer Tony Bennett. It was originally recorded in 1958 and released in 1959 on Columbia as CL 1301.

Track listing
"The Skyscraper Blues" (Jenkins, Adair) - 7:08
"Penthouse Serenade (When We're Alone)" (Will Jason, Val Burton) - 6:17
"By Myself" (Arthur Schwartz, Howard Dietz) - 2:54
"I Cover the Waterfront" (Green, Heyman) - 4:58
"Love Is Here to Stay" (George Gershwin, Ira Gershwin) - 2:21
"The Party's Over" (Jule Styne, Betty Comden, Adolph Green) - 3:35

Recorded on November 3 (#1, 3), November 4 (#4-6) and November 6 (#2), 1958.

Personnel
Tony Bennett – vocals
Ralph Burns - arranger & conductor
Ralph Sharon - piano
Ed Caine, Walt Levinsky (#1, 3), J. Palmer, Romeo Penque, A. Epstein (#2) - reeds
Al Cohn - tenor saxophone (#4-6)
Danny Bank - baritone saxophone
Al De Risi, Bernie Glow (#1-3), James Maxwell (#2, 4-6), Marky Markowitz, Carl Poole (#4-6) - trumpet
Billy Byers, Urbie Green (#1-3), William Elton (#2, 4-6), Chauncey Welsch (#1, 3-6) - trombone
Toots Mondello - alto saxophone, clarinet (#2, 4-6)
Al Caiola (#1, 3), Barry Galbraith (#2, 4-6)- guitar
Janet Putman - harp
Pat Merola (#1, 3), Milt Hinton (#2, 4-6) - bass
Eddie Costa - percussion (#2, 4-6)
Terry Snyder - drums (#1, 3)
Don Lamond - drums (#2, 4-6), percussion (#1, 3)
Robert Abernathy (#2, 4-6), Ranier C. De Intinis (#4-6), Joseph Singer (#4-6), Ray Alonge (#2), Richard L. Berg (#2) - unspecified instruments

Strings
Seymour Barab, Burt Fisch, Harold Colletta (#2, 4-6), Lucien Schmidt (#4-6), Howard Kay, Harvey Shapiro, Alan Shulman, Isadore Zirr - violoncello, viola
Arnold Eidus, Julius Held, Max Hollander, Harry Lookofsky (#4-6), Harry Edison (#4-6, Leo Kruczek, Tosha Samoroff, H. Urbont, Maurice Wilk, Paul Winter, David Nadien (#2), Fred Buldrini (#2) - violin

References

1959 albums
Tony Bennett albums
Albums conducted by Ralph Burns
Albums produced by Mitch Miller
Columbia Records albums